is a Japanese voice actress and singer.

Biography
She attended Nihon Narration Engi Kenkyujo, a voice actor training school before becoming affiliated with then management company. She is now affiliated with Link Plan. Due to her sharp vocal tones, she often voices tsundere characters (although she has voiced other mysterious or flirtatious characters). Taketatsu formed a singing unit Petit Milady alongside Aoi Yūki in 2013. Taketatsu left the talent agency Assemble Heart for the agency Link Plan on January 1, 2017. On her 30th birthday, she announced on Twitter that she married Yuki Kaji. On June 30, 2022, she and Kaji announced that they were expecting their first child together. On November 3, 2022, the couple announced that Taketatsu gave birth to their first child.

Filmography

Anime series

Video games

2011
The Legend of Heroes: Trails to Azure – Shirley Orlando

2012
Kingdom Hearts 3D: Dream Drop Distance – Rhyme
Persona 4 Arena – Labrys

2013
Drakengard 3 – Four
Macross 30: The Voice that Connects the Galaxy – Mei Leeron, Mia Sakaki
Sword Art Online: Infinity Moment – Leafa
Super Danganronpa another 2 - Iroha Nijiue

2014
Dengeki Bunko: Fighting Climax – Leafa, Kirino Kōsaka
Sword Art Online: Hollow Fragment – Leafa

2015
Deemo: The Last Recital – Little Girl / Alice
Dengeki Bunko: Fighting Climax Ignition – Leafa, Kousaka Kirino
Digimon Story: Cyber Sleuth – Tawa Reiko
Megadimension Neptunia VII – B-Sha
Sword Art Online: Lost Song – Leafa

2016
Accel World vs. Sword Art Online – Leafa
Dragon Quest Heroes II  – Jessica
World of Final Fantasy – Tama
Sword Art Online: Hollow Realization – Leafa
Alternative Girls  – Miyaka Yuki

2017
Project Tokyo Dolls – Aya
The Legend of Heroes: Trails of Cold Steel III – Shirley Orlando
Xenoblade Chronicles 2 - Zenobia

2018
BlazBlue: Cross Tag Battle – Labrys
Puella Magi Madoka Magica Side Story: Magia Record – Alina Gray
Sdorica – Alice, Masked Girl
Sword Art Online: Fatal Bullet – Leafa
Master of Eternity - Jeanie
Han-gyaku-Sei Million Arthur – Wildcat Arthur
Million Arthur: Arcana Blood – Wildcat Arthur
Dragalia Lost – Natalie
Shojo Kageki Revue Starlight: Re LIVE – Misora Kano
The Legend of Heroes: Trails of Cold Steel IV – Shirley Orlando (non-playable)

2019
Arknights — W
SoulWorker  - Chii Aruel

2020
Another Eden – Altena
Bleach: Brave Souls - Bambietta Basterbine

2021
Shin Megami Tensei V – Nuwa

2022
Alchemy Stars – Nina
Armada Girls – Ghost Ship X
Goddess of Victory: Nikke – Privaty

2023
Sword Art Online: Last Recollection – Leafa

Unknown date
Honkai Impact 3rd – Frederika Nikola Tesla
Nora to Toki no Kōbō: Kiri no Mori no Majo – Nora Brundle
Ore no Imōto ga Konna ni Kawaii Wake ga Nai Portable – Kirino Kōsaka
Rune Factory 4 – Dolce
Pokémon Black 2 and White 2 – Bel/Bianca (Black 2 White 2 Animated Trailer)
Trinity Universe – Tsubaki
The Idolmaster Cinderella Girls – Sachiko Koshimizu
Call of Duty: Black Ops II – Anderson (Japanese Dub Version)
K-On! Hōkago Live!! – Azusa Nakano
Phantasy Star Online 2 – Io
Date A Live Rinne Utopia – Itsuka Kotori
Dragon Quest VIII and Dragon Quest: Heroes – Jessica Albert
High School DxD New Fight – Koneko Tōjo
The Legend of Heroes: Trails to Azure – Shirley Orlando
Mobile Suit Gundam Side Story: Missing Link – Annerose Rosenheim
Mobile Suit Gundam Extreme Vs Full Boost – Sthesia Awar
Mobile Suit Gundam Extreme Vs Maxi Boost – Sthesia Awar, Sthesia Awar Acht,Sthesia Awar Primo, Sthesia Awar Nono, Sthesia Awar Sesto
Little Noah – Noah
Figure Fantasy - Rinn

OVA/OAD
Kissxsis – Ako Suminoe

Tokusatsu
Kaitou Sentai Lupinranger VS Keisatsu Sentai Patranger (2018) – Goche Ru Medou (eps. 1 – 8, 10 – 48)
Kaitou Sentai Lupinranger VS Keisatsu Sentai Patranger en Film (2018) – Goche Ru Medou

Drama CD
 Love DNA XX – Aoi
 Ore no Imōto ga Konna ni Kawaii Wake ga Nai – Kirino Kōsaka
 Tsuki Tsuki! – Nazuna Nanjō
 Watashi ni xx Shinasai! – Mami Mizuno
 Citrus – Yuzu Aihara
 Mo Dao Zu Shi/Ma Dou So Shi – Jiang Yanli/Kou Enri

Anime films

Dubbing

Live-action
Genius, 10-year-old Hans Albert Einstein (Alice Edwards)
Jexi, Cate Finnegan (Alexandra Shipp)

Animation
The Angry Birds Movie 2, Silver

Others
Citrus (manga) – Yuzu Aihara (promotional videos)

Discography

Albums

Compilation albums

Singles

Music in anime
As the voice actor for Azusa Nakano in K-On!, she is a member of the band Hokago Tea Time, and has participated in seven singles and one album.

 Hōkago Teatime (放課後ティータイム) ranked No. 1 on Oricon albums charts.
 "Azusa Nakano" ("中野 梓") image song CD of the eponymous character, ranked No. 3 on Oricon singles charts.
 "Go! Go! Maniac" ranked No. 1 on Oricon singles charts.
 "Listen!!" ranked No. 2 on Oricon singles charts.
 "Pure Pure Heart" (ぴゅあぴゅあはーと) ranked No. 4 on Oricon singles charts.
 "Utauyo!! Miracle" ranked No. 3 on Oricon singles charts.
 "No, Thank You!" ranked No. 2 on Oricon singles charts.
 "Gohan wa Okazu/U&I" ranked No. 3 on Oricon singles charts.

She additionally performed Hey! Calorie Queen (Hey!カロリーQueen), the ending theme for Dagashi Kashi. It was ranked No. 19 on Oricon singles charts.

References

External links
   
 Official agency profile 
 

1989 births
Living people
Anime singers
Japanese women pop singers
Japanese video game actresses
Japanese voice actresses
Musicians from Saitama Prefecture
Pony Canyon artists
Voice actresses from Saitama Prefecture
Japanese YouTubers